Parliamentary elections were held in Egypt from 28 November 2011 to 11 January 2012, following the revolution that ousted President Hosni Mubarak, after which the Supreme Council of the Armed Forces (SCAF) dissolved Parliament. However the dissolution was ruled unconstitutional and Parliament was reinstated. Originally, the elections had been scheduled to be held in September 2011, but were postponed amid concerns that established parties would gain undue advantage.

The elections were proclaimed the first honest national elections of any sort held in Egypt since the overthrow of the monarchy in 1952. However, there were also complaints of irregularities and fraud. The main focus of the newly elected Parliament was to be the selection of the members of a Constituent Assembly.

Background

In late 2010, a parliamentary election was held, though it was followed by controversy and repression as well as accusations of fraud.

Following similar events in Tunisia during the Arab Spring, Egyptian activists called for protesters to turn up in cities around Egypt on specific days. Though violence was reported at some points, protests were largely peaceful with the army staying quiet until 10 February 2011, when calls for Hosni Mubarak to resign were at their peak. The following day, Vice President Omar Suleiman announced Mubarak's resignation from the presidency while turning power over to the military. The Supreme Council of the Armed Forces, headed by Field Marshal Mohamed Hussein Tantawi, would lead the country for a transitional period until a civilian government took over.

A constitutional referendum was then approved on 19 March that would ease the process of electing a president.

New electoral law
The election was conducted under a parallel voting system. Two-thirds of seats were elected by party-list proportional representation. The remaining one-third were elected under a form of bloc voting in two-seat constituencies.

Choosing the system

Prior to the elections there were concerns that a change to the electoral system would be required, as the pre-existing system would have favoured the National Democratic Party, the party of Mubarak loyalists. The National Democratic Party was dissolved in April, however.

The proposed draft law for the electoral system to be used was revealed on 30 May 2011; controversially, it retained bloc voting for two-thirds of the seats, with only one third of the seats elected by proportional representation (However, later it was changed as to two-thirds, 332 of MPs to be elected proportionally from lists).

On 7 July 2011, the caretaker government approved the new electoral law. It outlined a new 50–50 division between proportional seats and constituency seats; the minimum age limit for candidates is also to be reduced from 30 to 25.

On 21 July 2011, the SCAF announced:
 that the election (for both the People's Assembly and the Shura Council) would be held in three rounds in October, with 15-day intervals in-between;
 that half the seats would be reserved for laborers and farmers;
 that the women's quota introduced under Mubarak would be abolished.

In late September 2011, again new division was announced, in which only one third of the seats would be elected by bloc voting in two-seat constituencies. However, constituency MPs could only be independents and not members of political parties; this restriction led to threats of boycotting the election by a wide swath of the political parties which intended to contest the election. The parties stated that their demands for a change in the electoral law would have to be met by 2 October, else they would boycott the election. After a meeting with political party leaders on 1 October 2011, the SCAF agreed to allow party members to run for the directly elected seats, set a clearer timetable for the transition to civilian rule and possibly abolish military trials for civilians.

On 11 November 2011, an administrative court in Mansoura ruled that former NDP members were not allowed to stand in the election as independent candidates. It was not immediately known whether this ruling would eventually apply to the whole country. On 14 November 2011, the Higher Administrative Court in Cairo overruled the decision and allowed the former NDP members to stand.

Voting process
The election to the People's Assembly took place on the following dates:
 first stage: 28–29 November, run-off on 5–6 December;
 second stage: 14–15 December, run-off on 21–22 December;
 third stage: 3–4 January, run-off on 10–11 January.

There are a total 508 seats in the Lower house: 498 seats are elected, and 10 seats appointed, in this case, by the Military Council, and usually by the President.

Under the parallel voting system used, out of 498 total seats, two-thirds, meaning 332, were elected by means of party list proportional representation. For these seats the public voted for parties or coalition-lists and the result was determined by the largest remainder method with a 0.5 percent threshold, in 46 districts.

The remaining 166 seats were elected by bloc voting in two-seat constituencies, with the possibility of a run off. In the election voters each cast two votes, which could not be for the same individual. These seats were open to candidates running as individuals, who might not be affiliated to political parties, numbering two per each of the 83 districts. Out of these, the new parliament must have at least half "laborers" or "farmers", while the "professionals" should constitute at most half of the parliament. If the winner of one of the two seats that are allocated to a certain district, is a "professional", the second seat in the district shall be handed to a "laborer" or a "farmer". Run-offs are assigned to the individual candidates who did not receive over 50% of the votes in the first round. For a detailed explanation, see.

Additional requirements for parties include listing at least one woman and adopting a specific visual symbol, as an alternative detection to help the illiterate voters. The same voting procedures shall apply to the upper house's election, too.

The election for the upper house, the Shura Council ("the Consultative Council") are to follow on 29 January 2012, and will take place in 3 stages as well between 29 January and 22 February. (process was sped due to ongoing protests). Out of a total 270 seats in the Upper House: 180 seats are up for grabs and 90 seats shall be appointed after the presidential election, by the president-elect. Following these elections, the parliament shall select a committee that will draft a new constitution for Egypt. The new constitution shall than be submitted to a referendum. Only then will presidential election be held, "no later than 30 June 2012" according to Hussein Tantawi's statement.

Parties
The Muslim Brotherhood announced on 15 February it would form the Freedom and Justice Party to run in the election. Together with 27 other parties representing diverse political families, the Freedom and Justice Party formed the Democratic Alliance for Egypt. After several defections and entries, the Freedom and Justice Party-dominated coalition settled on 11 parties. The FJP fielded the overwhelming majority of the candidates, and all the Democratic Alliance for Egypt joint candidates ran under the FJP label.

As a reaction to this centre-right alliance, the different liberal democratic and centrist parties intensified cooperation. Five parties drafted a joint statement criticising the current electoral law and proposing a new one. On 16 August 15 political and social movements, some of which defected from the Democratic Alliance for Egypt, announced the Egyptian Bloc electoral alliance. It consisted of liberal, secularist, and centre-left political parties, as well as social organizations and labour unions, and also the traditional Islamic Sufi Liberation Party. Its main objective was to prevent an imminent electoral victory of the Muslim Brotherhood, and the Freedom and Justice Party. After suffering many defections, the remaining Egyptian Bloc parties were: the Free Egyptians Party, the Egyptian Social Democratic Party and the National Progressive Unionist Party (Tagammu).

The Socialist Popular Alliance Party and other parties defected from the Egyptian Bloc after it allowed Mubarak figures in its ranks; the Socialist Popular Alliance Party formed The Revolution Continues Alliance.

The liberal New Wafd Party announced on 13 June 2011 that it would contest the election in an alliance with the Freedom and Justice Party. The New Wafd later decided to abandon its alliance with the Islamists over discrepancies concerning the prospective constitution, and considered joining the new Egyptian Bloc liberal coalition instead. The New Wafd ended up running its own independent lists.

The Salafi Al-Nour Party withdrew from the Democratic Alliance for Egypt coalition due to disagreements with the Freedom and Justice Party over its share in the coalition's joint candidate lists. On 12 August, three Islamic Salafi parties (Nour, and two unregistered groups that later became the Authenticity Party and the Building and Development Party) announced that they would run a united candidate list. Their common list is officially called the "Alliance for Egypt", and is unofficially referred to as the "Islamist Bloc". The Al-Nour Party fielded the overwhelming majority of the candidates, and all the Alliance for Egypt joint candidates are running under the Al-Nour Party label.

The Al-Wasat Party, a moderate Islamic offshoot of the Muslim Brotherhood, was officially approved as a party on 19 February, fifteen years after its foundation. After withdrawing from the Democratic Alliance for Egypt, it formed an electoral coalition with the Renaissance Party and the Pioneer Party, both of which were founded by former members of the Muslim Brotherhood. The Al-Wasat Party fielded the overwhelming majority of the coalition candidates, all of which ran under the Al-Wasat Party label.

Some analysts voiced concerns that former members of the ruling NDP might gain a lot of influence in the newly elected parliament. Among the parties identified to have had a strong base in former NDP members were:
 the Egyptian Citizen Party, led by former NDP secretary-general Mohamed Ragab (other former NDP members include Hamdi El-Sayed, Abdel Ahad Gamal El Din and Nabil Louka Bibawi);
 Egypt Revival Party (Misr El-Nahda)/Union Party (Egypt) (Al-Etihad), led by former NDP secretary-general Hossam Badrawi; the party was officially registered under the second name on 20 September 2011;
 the Freedom Party (Horreya), led by Mamdouh Ali Hassan, son of Mohamed Mahmoud (a large number of former NDP MPs joined this party);
 the Nationalist Egypt Party, led by Anwar Sadat's nephew, the late Talaat Sadat; last chairman of the NDP

Monitors
The Supreme Council of the Armed Forces announced that it would bar foreign monitors because of what it claimed was the preservation of Egyptian sovereignty.
However, it would welcome foreign "Observers". Groups such as NDI, The Carter Center, the International Republican Institute and South African, Turkish, Polish and Danish groups have taken part. Alongside 300 foreign civil society representatives there are 25,000 accredited monitors and a lot more concerned citizens who have pledged to alert the organizers regarding any abuses they encounter.
Additionally, many Egyptians have turned to citizen monitoring through social media such as Facebook, Twitter and YouTube, uploading cited violations or turnouts.

Opinion polls

Voter turnout
About 50 million people were eligible to vote out of a population in excess of 85 million – with candidates from 50 registered political parties. The overall voter turnout was 54%.

First phase
In the first phase of election, the voter turnout was 59%.

First phase, 28–29 November
Large crowds turned out at the polling stations for the first stage of the polls. Such a turnout prompted the election committee to extend the hours of polling by two hours to end at 21:00.
A majority of the protesters in Tahrir square who had been at the sit-in after deadly clashes a week earlier, left their sit-in to join the polls before returning to Tahrir Square, although some boycotted the election.

Even before the government gave the official figures, the FJP's observers estimated a turnout of about 30 to 32 percent, for the first day, in the 9 governorates that voted in the first phase, while in Cairo, turnout was reported at about 27 percent. An "exceptionally high turnout" was also reported in the governorate of Asyut, especially among women. On the second day of the first round, independent monitors placed the turnout at over 50 percent, while a spokesman for the military said that it could exceed 70 percent, maybe even reaching 80 percent. Abroad, turnout was around 60–70 percent according to the Egyptian foreign minister, and when reading the official results the head of the election committee stated that the overall turnout was 62%, "the highest number since the days of Pharaoh."

First phase run-offs, 5–6 December
The turnout was relatively low according to Al Jazeera, one of the reasons was that the Egyptians were not given a day off as they were given on 28–29 November.

Second phase
Second phase, 14–15 December
Early reports on the voting turnout indicated a high turnout of long waiting lines, a repeat of the first PR phase voting day. The turnout for the first round was 65%.

Second phase run-offs, 21–22 December
Turnout for the run-offs of the second phase was 43%.

Third phase
Voter turnout was 62%.

Results
Many individual candidates did not receive the required 50% vote during the first phase, and therefore faced a run-off on 5 December. Even before the official results for each party or coalition-list were released, it was thought, by various international channels as well as leaks from people involved in the count, that the Freedom and Justice Party, led by the Muslim Brotherhood, was expected to receive around 40% of the vote and al-Nour would get between 15–30 percent. The Election Commission announced the participation of 62% of eligible voters, "the highest number since the days of Pharaoh".

In the second phase of the election, many analysts predicted a similar result as that of the previous phase due to the more conservative, poor, and rural nature of the second phase electoral districts. State television reported the initial result, with the FJP in the lead and al-Nour following in second place.

Toward the third phase it was clear that it would be a continuation of the Islamist trend that emerged from the two previous phases.

After the third phase, on 21 January 2012, the Supreme Council of the Armed Forces appointed the remaining 10 MPs.

Combined results

Note that various media sources report slightly different numbers. This is due to the fact that many "independents" and appointed MPs are party members, or joined established parties. In addition, some smaller parties fielded candidates on the official lists of larger allied parties.

|- style="background:#e9e9e9;"
!class="unsortable"|
! style="text-align:center;"| Party
! style="text-align:center;"| Ideology
! style="text-align:center;"| Votes
! style="text-align:center;"| Vote %
! style="text-align:center;"| PR Seats
! style="text-align:center;"| FPTP Seats
! style="text-align:center;"| Total Seats
! style="text-align:center;"| Component Parties
|-
| style="background-color:" width=1|
| style="text-align:left;" | Democratic Alliance for Egypt(led by the Freedom and Justice Party)
| style="text-align:left;" | Nationalist-reformist
| 10,138,134
| 37.5
| 127
| 108
| 235
| style="text-align:left;" |  Freedom & Justice Party: 213  Dignity Party: 6  Ghad El-Thawra Party: 2  Civilization Party: 2  Islamic Labour Party: 1  Egyptian Arab Socialist Party: 1  Egyptian Reform Party: 1  Affiliated Independents 9
|-
| style="background-color:" width=1|
| style="text-align:left;" | Islamist Bloc(led by Al-Nour Party)
| style="text-align:left;" | Islamist - Salafi
| 7,534,266
|27.8
| 96
| 25 or 27
| 121 or 123
| style="text-align:left;" |  Al-Nour Party: 107  Building & Development Party: 13  Authenticity Party: 3 
|-
| style="background-color:" width=1|
| style="text-align:left;" | New Wafd Party
| style="text-align:left;" | National-liberal
| 2,480,391
| 9.2
| 37
| 4
| 41
|
|-
| style="background-color:" width=1|
| style="text-align:left;" | Egyptian Bloc
| style="text-align:left;" | Centre-left/Secular
| 2,402,238
| 8.9
| 33
| 2or 1
| 35 or 34
| style="text-align:left;" | Social Democratic Party: 16  Free Egyptians Party: 15  Progressive Unionist Party: 4 
|-
| style="background-color:" width=1|
| style="text-align:left;" | Al-Wasat Party
| style="text-align:left;" | Moderate Islamist
| 989,003
| 3.7
| 10
| 0
| 10
|
|-
| style="background-color:" width=1|
| style="text-align:left;" | The Revolution Continues Alliance
| style="text-align:left;" | Leftist
| 745,863
| 2.8
| 7
| 2
| 9
| style="text-align:left;" |  Socialist Popular Alliance Party: 7  Freedom Egypt Party: 1  Equality & Development Party: 1 
|-
| style="background-color:" width=1|
| style="text-align:left;" | Reform and Development Party
| style="text-align:left;" | Liberal
| 604,415
| 2.2
| 8
| 1
| 9
|
|-
| style="background:Orange; width:1px;"|
| style="text-align:left;" | Freedom Party
| style="text-align:left;" | NDP offshoot
| 514,029
| 1.9
| 4
| 0
| 4
|
|-
| style="background:Yellow; width:1px;"|
| style="text-align:left;" | National Party of Egypt
| style="text-align:left;" | NDP offshoot
| 425,021
| 1.6
| 4
| 1
| 5
|
|-
| style="background:#999999; width:1px;"|
| style="text-align:left;" | Egyptian Citizen Party
| style="text-align:left;" | NDP offshoot
| 235,395
| 0.9
| 3
| 1
| 4
|
|-
| style="background:#B6B6B6; width:1px;"|
| style="text-align:left;" | Union Party
| style="text-align:left;" | NDP offshoot
| 141,382
| 0.5
| 2
| 0
| 2
|
|-
| style="background:#999999; width:1px;"|
| style="text-align:left;" | Conservative Party
| style="text-align:left;" | NDP offshoot
| 272,910
| 1.0
| 0
| 1
| 1
|
|-
| style="background:#CCCCCC; width:1px;"|
| style="text-align:left;" | Democratic Peace Party
| style="text-align:left;" | NDP offshoot
| 248,281
| 0.9
| 1
| 0
| 1
|
|-
| style="background:black; width:1px;"|
| style="text-align:left;" | Justice Party
| style="text-align:left;" | Centrist-secular
| 184,553
| 0.7
| 0
| 1
| 1
|
|-
| style="background:#B6B6B6; width:1px;"|
| style="text-align:left;" | Arab Egyptian Unity Party
| style="text-align:left;" | NDP offshoot
| 149,253
| 0.6
| 1
| 0
| 1
|
|-
| style="background:#B6B6B6; width:1px;"|
| style="text-align:left;" | Nasserist Party
| style="text-align:left;" | Nasserist
|  
|  
| 1
| 0
| 1
|
|-
| style="background:white; width:1px;"|
| style="text-align:left;" | Independents
| style="text-align:left;" | Independents
| -
| -
| -
| 21
| 21
|
|-
| style="width:1px;"|
| style="text-align:left;" | Total elected
| style="text-align:left;" | elected MPs
| 27,065,135
| 100.00
| 332
| 166
| 498
|
|-
| style="width:1px;"|
| style="text-align:left;" | SCAF appointees
| style="text-align:left;" | non-elected MPs
| -
| -
| -
| -
| 10
|
|-
| style="width:1px;"|
| style="text-align:left;" | Total
| style="text-align:left;" |MPs
| -
| -
| -
| -
| 508
|
|-
|colspan=9 | Sources: Ahram Online, Al-Masry Al-Youm, Al-Ahram
|}

First phase

On 4 and 6 December, the result from the first phase of the proportional representation was released. Although PR seats are assigned per district, party lists must pass a national threshold of 0.5% to be eligible to get seats on the district level. The Egyptian authorities did release seat allocation for the constituency (bloc voting) seats.
The number of PR seats shown in this table are unofficial calculations from Jadaliyya using the largest remainder method. Unofficial results are italicised:

|- style="background:#e9e9e9;"
!class="unsortable"|
! style="text-align:center;"| Party
! style="text-align:center;"| Ideology
! style="text-align:center;"| PR Votes
! style="text-align:center;"| PR Vote %
! style="text-align:center;"| PR Seats3
! style="text-align:center;"| FPTP Seats4
! style="text-align:center;"| Total Seats
! style="text-align:center;"| Seat
|- style="text-align:right;"
|bgcolor="" width=1|
| align=left |Freedom and Justice1
|align="left"| Muslim Brotherhood Islamist
| 3,565,092
| 36.6
| 40
| 33
| 73
| 49%
|- style="text-align:right;"
|bgcolor="" width=1|
| style="text-align:left;"| Al-Nour 2
|align="left" | Salafi Islamist
| 2,371,713
| 24.4
| 26
| 4
| 30
| 20%
|- style="text-align:right;"
|bgcolor="" width=1|
| style="text-align:left;"| Egyptian Bloc
|align="left" | Liberal democrats
| 1,299,819
| 13.4
| 13
| 2
| 15
| 10%
|- style="text-align:right;"
|  style="background:; width:1px;"|
| style="text-align:left;"| New Wafd
|align="left" | National liberals
| 690,077
| 7.1
| 10
| 1
| 11
| 7%
|- style="text-align:right;"
|bgcolor="" width=1|
| style="text-align:left;"| Al-Wasat
|align="left" | Moderate Islamic/Liberal Democratic
| 415,590
| 4.3
| 4
| 0
| 4
| 3%
|- style="text-align:right;"
|  style="background:; width:1px;"|
| style="text-align:left;"| Revolution Continues
|align="left" | Leftists
| 335,947
| 3.5
| 4
| 2
| 6
| 4%
|- style="text-align:right;"
| bgcolor="" style="width:1|
| style="text-align:left;"| Reform and Development
|align="left" | Liberals
| 185,138
| 1.9
| 2
| 0
| 2
| 1%
|- style="text-align:right;"
|  style="background:Yellow; width:1px;"|
| style="text-align:left;"| National Party of Egypt
|align="left" | Former NDP Members
| 153,429
| 1.6
| 1
| 1
| 2
| 1%
|- style="text-align:right;"
|  style="background:Orange; width:1px;"|
| style="text-align:left;"| Freedom
|align="left" | Former NDP Members
| 136,784
| 1.4
| 1
| 0
| 1
| <1%
|- style="text-align:right;"
|  style="background:Black; width:1px;"|
| style="text-align:left;"| Justice
|align="left" | Centrists
| 76,769
| 0.8
| 0
| 1
| 1
| <1%
|- style="text-align:right;"
| bgcolor="" style="width:1px;"|
| style="text-align:left;"| Conservative
|align="left" | Conservatives
| 76,743
| 0.8
| 0
| 0
| 0
| 0%
|- style="text-align:right;"
| bgcolor="" style="width:1px;"|
| style="text-align:left;"| Egyptian Citizen
|align="left" | Former NDP Members
| 67,602
| 0.7
| 1
| 1
| 2
| 1%
|- style="text-align:right;"
| bgcolor="" style="width:1px;"|
| style="text-align:left;"| Democratic Peace Party
|align="left" | Liberal Democracy
| 51,704
| 0.5
| 0
| 0
| 0
| 0%
|- style="text-align:right;"
|  style="background:gray; width:1px;"|
| style="text-align:left;"| Other/Independents
| style="text-align:left;"| ----
| 308,106
| 3.2
| 0
| 3
| 3
| 2%
|- class="sortbottom" | style="background-color:#E9E9E9" | align="right"
|
|align="left"|Total
| style="text-align:left;"| 
| 9,734,513
|100
|102
|48
|150
|100
|}
Notes: 1Freedom and Justice list includes candidates from the parties of the Democratic Alliance for Egypt. 2Al-Nour's list includes candidates from the parties of the Alliance for Egypt ("Islamist Bloc"). 3Preliminary results, includes all but Cairo's party-list district No. 1 (10 seats), annulled by the Higher Elections Commission, and scheduled to re-vote on 10–11 January. 4Includes all but two races in Cairo's district No. 1, two races in Alexandria's district No. 3, two races in Assiut district No. 2 and two races in Assiut's district No. 3 (a total of 8 seats), scheduled for a re-vote on 10–11 January.

Second phase

In the second phase, various secular parties, including the New Wafd, Adl, Egyptian Bloc, and Revolution Continues, attempted to coordinate their efforts with regard to some constituency (bloc voting) seats.

On 24 December 2011, official results were announced:

|- style="background:#e9e9e9;"
!class="unsortable"|
! style="text-align:center;"| Party
! style="text-align:center;"| Ideology
! style="text-align:center;"| PR Votes
! style="text-align:center;"| PR Vote %
! style="text-align:center;"| PR Seats1
! style="text-align:center;"| FPTP Seats2
! style="text-align:center;"| Total Seats
! style="text-align:center;"| Seat
|- style="text-align:right;"
|bgcolor="" width=1|
| align=left |Freedom and Justice
|align="left"| Muslim Brotherhood Islamist
|  4,058,498
|36.3
| 35
| 36
| 71
| 48%
|- style="text-align:right;"
|bgcolor="" width=1|
| style="text-align:left;"| Al-Nour
|align="left" | Salafi Islamist
| 3,216,430
| 28.8
| 28
| 13
| 41
| 28%
|- style="text-align:right;"
|  style="background:; width:1px;"|
| style="text-align:left;"| New Wafd
|align="left" | National liberals
| 1,077,244
| 9.6
| 11
| 0
| 11
| 8%
|- style="text-align:right;"
|bgcolor="" width=1|
| style="text-align:left;"| Egyptian Bloc
|align="left" | Liberal democrats
| 785,084
| 7.0
| 8
| 0
| 8
| 6%
|- style="text-align:right;"
|bgcolor="" width=1|
| style="text-align:left;"| Al-Wasat
|align="left" | Moderate Islamic/Liberal Democratic
| 368,375
| 3.3
| 3
| 0
| 3
| 2%
|- style="text-align:right;"
| bgcolor="" style="width:1px;"|
| style="text-align:left;"| Reform and Development
|align="left" | Liberals
| 231,713
| 2.1
| 2
| 1
| 3
| 2%
|- style="text-align:right;"
|  style="background:Yellow; width:1px;"|
| style="text-align:left;"| National Party of Egypt
|align="left" | Former NDP Members
| 169,662
| 1.5
| 1
| 0
| 1
| <1%
|- style="text-align:right;"
|  style="background:; width:1px;"|
| style="text-align:left;"| Revolution Continues
|align="left" | Leftists
| 161,594
| 1.4
| 1
| 0
| 1
| <1%
|- style="text-align:right;"
| bgcolor="" style="width:1px;"|
| style="text-align:left;"| Egyptian Citizen
|align="left" | Former NDP Members
| 151,314
| 1.4
| 1
| 0
| 1
| <1%
|- style="text-align:right;"
| bgcolor="" style="width:1px;"|
| style="text-align:left;"| Conservative
|align="left" | Conservatives
| 139,100
| 1.2
| 0
| 0
| 0
| 0%
|- style="text-align:right;"
| bgcolor="" style="width:1px;"|
| style="text-align:left;"| Democratic peace
|align="left" | Liberal democracy
| 121,694
| 1.1
| 0
| 0
| 0
| 0%
|- style="text-align:right;"
|  style="background:Orange; width:1px;"|
| style="text-align:left;"| Freedom
|align="left" | Former NDP Members
| 97,165
| 0.9
| 0
| 0
| 0
| 0%
|- style="text-align:right;"
|  style="background:Black; width:1px;"|
| style="text-align:left;"| Justice
|align="left" | Centrists
| 46,681
| 0.4
| 0
| 1
| 1
| <1%
|- style="text-align:right;"
|  style="background:gray; width:1px;"|
| style="text-align:left;"| Other/Independents
| style="text-align:left;"| ----
| 
| 
| 2
| 5
| 7
| 5%
|- class="sortbottom" | style="background-color:#E9E9E9" | align="right"
|
|align="left"|Total
| style="text-align:left;"| 
|11,173,818
|
| 92
| 56
| 148
| 
|}

Notes: 1 Does not include the postponed or invalidated results of Aswan, Beheira (district 2), Sohag (district 2), and Menoufia (district 1). 2 Does not include the invalidated results of Shaqiya's districts 5 and 2.

Third phase

|- style="background:#e9e9e9;"
!class="unsortable"|
! style="text-align:center;"| Party
! style="text-align:center;"| Ideology
! style="text-align:center;"| PR Votes
! style="text-align:center;"| PR Vote %
! style="text-align:center;"| PR Seats
! style="text-align:center;"| FPTP Seats
! style="text-align:center;"| Total Seats
! style="text-align:center;"| Seat
|- style="text-align:right;"
|bgcolor="" width=1|
| align=left |Freedom and Justice Party
|align="left"| Muslim Brotherhood Islamist
| 
|
|37
| 
|
| 
|- style="text-align:right;"
|bgcolor="" width=1|
| style="text-align:left;"| Al-Nour Party
|align="left" | Salafi Islamist
| 
| 
|29
|
| 
| 
|- style="text-align:right;"
|  style="background:; width:1px;"|
| style="text-align:left;"| New Wafd Party
|align="left" | National liberals
| 
| 
|13
| 
| 
| 
|- style="text-align:right;"
|bgcolor="" width=1|
| style="text-align:left;"| Egyptian Bloc
|align="left" | Liberal democrats
| 
| 
|6
|
| 
| 
|- style="text-align:right;"
| bgcolor="" style="width:1px;"|
| style="text-align:left;"| Reform and Development
|align="left" | Liberals
| 
| 
|4
| 
| 
|
|- style="text-align:right;"
|  style="background:; width:1px;"|
| style="text-align:left;"| Revolution Continues
|align="left" | Leftists
| 
| 
|3
|
| 
| 
|- style="text-align:right;"
|  style="background:Orange; width:1px;"|
| style="text-align:left;"| Freedom
|align="left" | Former NDP Members
| 
| 
|3
|
| 
| 
|- style="text-align:right;"
|  style="background:Yellow; width:1px;"|
| style="text-align:left;"| National Party of Egypt
|align="left" | Former NDP Members
| 
|
|2
| 
| 
| 
|- style="text-align:right;"
|bgcolor="" width=1|
| style="text-align:left;"| Al-Wasat Party
|align="left" | Moderate Islamist/Liberal Democratic
| 
|
|1
| 
| 
| 
|- style="text-align:right;"
| bgcolor="" style="width:1px;"|
| style="text-align:left;"| Nasserist
|align="left" | Left-wing nationalism
| 
|
|1
| 
| 
| 
|- style="text-align:right;"
| bgcolor="" style="width:1px;"|
| style="text-align:left;"| Union (Hizb al-Ittihad)
|align="left" | Former NDP Members
| 
|
|1
| 
| 
| 
|- style="text-align:right;"
|  style="background:Black; width:1px;"|
| style="text-align:left;"| Justice Party (Adl)
|align="left" | Centrists
| 
|
|0
| 
| 
| 
|- style="text-align:right;"
| bgcolor="" style="width:1px;"|
| style="text-align:left;"| Conservative Party
|align="left" | Conservatives
| 
|
|0
| 
|
| 
|- style="text-align:right;"
| bgcolor="" style="width:1px;"|
| style="text-align:left;"| Egyptian Citizen
|align="left" | Former NDP Members
| 
|
|0
| 
| 
|
|- style="text-align:right;"
| bgcolor="" style="width:1px;"|
| style="text-align:left;"| Democratic peace
|align="left" | Liberal democracy
| 
|
|0
| 
| 
| 
|- style="text-align:right;"
|  style="background:gray; width:1px;"|
| style="text-align:left;"| Other
| style="text-align:left;"| ----
| 
|
|0
|
| 
| 
|- class="sortbottom" | style="background-color:#E9E9E9" | align="right"
|
|align="left"|Total
| style="text-align:left;"| 
|
|
|100
|
| 
| 
|}
Source:

PR per governorate and district
The PR votes were released by the official election committee. Seats were computed by Jadaliyya. The official results were then released by the supreme committee of elections.

Note: Vote percentage reported for "Others" and "Former NDP Parties" is for those parties that won seats

Violence

A day after polls closed during the second phase of election to the lower house, clashes broke out again in front of the parliament and cabinet building in Cairo between security forces and several hundred demonstrators.  The demonstrators were protesting against the appointment of a new prime minister by the military council, and against the arrest and beating of one of the protesters there.

Reactions

The commander of the military police was quoted as saying that the ruling military council was not taking sides during the second phase of the election to the lower house and "stands at an equal distance" from all the political groups contesting the elections: "The army has no interest to be served by siding with liberals or the Brotherhood or leftists or others."

Following reports that the FJP was likely leading in the first round of the election, with al-Nour in second place, the FJP denied it would seek an alliance with Al-Nour.

Dissolution, reinstatement decree
On 14 June 2012, the Supreme Constitutional Court of Egypt ruled that the election was unconstitutional, and one third of the winners were illegitimate. The ruling was due, in part, to the fact that some seats were contested on a proportional list system, while others were contested on the first-past-the-post system. As a result, the court concluded, the election law had allowed political parties to compete for seats intended for independent candidates. "The makeup of the entire chamber is illegal and, consequently, it does not legally stand", explained the court. The ruling upheld a lower court decision, which had found the election law unconstitutional. The Muslim Brotherhood held the majority of the seats ruled unconstitutional.

In a separate ruling issued at the same time, the court threw out the Political Exclusion Law, which banned former members of President Hosni Mubarak's regime from running for office. The court concluded the law was not based on "objective grounds", and violated "the principle of equality". The court judges had all been appointed by Mubarak.

The ruling raised fears (in some) of the military trying to increase its power. The Muslim Brotherhood's popularity had decreased since the election, so new elections could result in a decrease of their seats in parliament. The dissolution of parliament creates the possibility of the panel to be tasked with writing a new constitution being appointed by the military. A politician from the Freedom and Justice Party predicted the ruling would send the country into a "dark tunnel". Other observers called the move a coup attempt and "a complete disregard for the free will of voters". In contrast, Ahmed Shafiq, who served as Prime Minister under Mubarak, called the ruling a "historic ... verdict that meant there was no way for anyone to do particular laws for particular people".

Angry protesters gathered outside the court building after the decision. Police in riot gear guarded the building.

Re-institution of the parliament has since been demanded by the protesters, the Muslim Brotherhood and others. Mohammed Morsi, sworn as Egypt's new president on 30 June, has initially refrained from speaking publicly on that (crucial to the extent of his own real power) issue. In his inauguration speech on 30 June, however, he gave an indication of his future efforts, calling the parliamentary election "free and fair". Within days of Morsi's inauguration, according to his spokesman, the President is actively searching for ways of restoring the parliament and obtaining a release of non-criminal political detainees.

A presidential decree was released on 8 July 2012, reinstating parliament until a new one is elected and mandating that it would write the new constitution instead of the Constitutional Assembly. The decree challenges the powers claimed by the SCAF military council. The Supreme Constitutional Court called that decree into question on 9 July 2012.

See also
Results of the 2011–12 Egyptian parliamentary election
2012 Egyptian presidential election

References

Further reading

External links
 The official website of Supreme Committee for Elections
 Q+A: How does Egypt's parliamentary election system work?, Reuters, 28 November 2011.
 Wael Eskandar, How Are Seat Winners Determined in the Egyptian Elections ?, adaliyya.com, 1 December 2011.

Elections in Egypt
Egypt
Egypt
Parliamentary election
Parliamentary election
House of Representatives (Egypt)
Parliamentary election
Annulled elections
Egypt
Egypt
Election and referendum articles with incomplete results